The Columbia University College of Dental Medicine, often abbreviated CDM, is one of the twenty graduate and professional schools of Columbia University. It is located at 630 West 168th Street in Manhattan, New York City. According to American Dental Education Association, CDM is one of the most selective dental schools in the United States based on average DAT score, GPA, and acceptance rate. In 2014, 2,029 people applied for 80 positions in its entering class. The median undergraduate GPA and average DAT score for successful applicants in 2020 were 3.62 and 22.8, respectively.

History
The College of Dental Medicine traces its origin to 1852, as the New York College of Dentistry, later the New York College of Dental and Oral Surgery. In 1916 Columbia University, recognizing dentistry as an integral part of the health sciences, established its own school of dental education and absorbed both the New York Post-graduate School of Dentistry and the New York School of Dental Hygiene, with a $100,000 gift from New York merchant James N. Jarvie. In 1923, the New York College of Dentistry merged with the New York College of Dental and Oral Surgery to form the present School of Dental and Oral Surgery of Columbia University. In January 2006, the School of Dental and Oral Surgery was renamed the Columbia University College of Dental Medicine.

Education
Like most American dental schools, the College of Dental Medicine at Columbia offers the following academic programs:
Advanced Education in General Dentistry Certificate (AEGD) Program
General Practice Residency
Oral and Maxillofacial Pathology Residency
Oral and Maxillofacial Surgery/MD Residency
Pediatric Dentistry Residency
Dental Public Health Program
Endodontics Program
Implantology Program
Orthodontics Program
Periodontics Program
Prosthodontics Program

Research
The College of Dental Medicine possesses several research facilities, including the Tissue Engineering and Regenerative Medicine Laboratory as well as the Center for Craniofacial Regeneration. The faculty engages in wide-ranging areas of research, from Oropharyngeal Cancer to Biomaterials/Regenerative Biology/Stem Cells, Neuroscience and Pain, Microbial Pathogenesis/Microbiome, Behavioral and Social Sciences/Population Oral Health, and Systemic and Oral Disease Interactions.

Columbia University has a long-standing, rich history in dental education and research. Dr. Gies (1872-1956), a professor of Biochemistry at the College of Physicians & Surgeons and a founder of the College of Dental Medicine, is recognized as a pioneer in the profession. He was an advocate for rigorous medical and scientific instruction in dental education. In the early 1950s the Birnberg Research Medal Award of the Dental Alumni of Columbia University was established to encourage dental research excellence and help stimulate public interest in support of dental research.

Publications

The College of Dental Medicine produces a number of annual publications:
• Primus: annual alumni magazine of the College of Dental Medicine
• Primus Notes: bi-annual newsletter of the College of Dental Medicine
 Primus & Primus Notes
• Columbia Dental Review: annual clinical publication of Columbia University College of Dental Medicine
• Journal of the William Jarvie Society: the Journal of the Student Honor and Research Society of the College of Dental Medicine
• College of Dental Medicine Bulletin: describes the mission, curriculum and courses of study at the College of Dental Medicine
• Dental Examiner: former publication of the Association of Dental Alumni, Columbia University College of Dental Medicine

School facilities
The College of Dental Medicine is located on the campus of the Columbia University Medical Center/New York-Presbyterian Hospital.

See also

American Student Dental Association
Columbia University
Ivy League
Dentistry

References

External links
 

Columbia University
Educational institutions established in 1916
Dental schools in New York (state)
1916 establishments in New York City